Joseph William Kinchin (11 June 1884 – 23 December 1969) was a British middle-distance runner. He competed in the men's 3200 metres steeplechase at the 1908 Summer Olympics.

References

1884 births
1969 deaths
Athletes (track and field) at the 1908 Summer Olympics
British male middle-distance runners
British male steeplechase runners
Olympic athletes of Great Britain
Place of birth missing